Two ships of the British Royal Navy have been named HMS Berkeley Castle after Berkeley Castle in the town of Berkeley, Gloucestershire.

 Berkeley Castle was a 48-gun wooden warship captured by the French Navy on 25 October 1695.

References

Royal Navy ship names